State Street Public School, is located in Newark, Essex County, New Jersey, United States. The building was built in 1845 and was added to the National Register of Historic Places on August 3, 1990. It is now the Audio-Video Division of the Newark Public Schools.

See also
National Register of Historic Places listings in Essex County, New Jersey

References

Italianate architecture in New Jersey
School buildings completed in 1845
Buildings and structures in Newark, New Jersey
National Register of Historic Places in Newark, New Jersey
New Jersey Register of Historic Places